Harry James Pritchard (born 14 September 1992) is an English professional footballer who plays for Barnet as a midfielder.

Career
Born in High Wycombe, Pritchard began his career at Flackwell Heath, where he competed in three seasons before moving onto Burnham in November 2011. After two months with the Blues, he joined Maidenhead United. He went on to spend six-and-a-half seasons with the Magpies, during which time he scored 41 league goals. Ten of these came in Maidenhead's National League South title-winning season in 2016–17, including a brace in a 3–0 win at Margate that secured the title on the last day of the season. In May 2017 he signed a new contract with the club, hitting a further 14 goals in their debut season in the National League, including braces against Chester and Guiseley and a penalty at Bromley. After a successful 2017–18 season, in which he also provided 12 assists, it was confirmed that Pritchard had joined Blackpool on a two-year deal on 27 May 2018. He made his English Football League debut for the Tangerines on the opening day on the 2018–19 season, playing the entire match at Wycombe Wanderers.

Pritchard signed a two-year contract with Bradford City on 30 August 2019. He made his debut for the club the next day, as a substitute, before he had trained with his teammates. His early performances for the club were praised by manager Gary Bowyer, who had also signed him for Blackpool. In October 2019 Pritchard said he owed a "debt" to Bowyer for giving him his first professional contract at Blackpool. Later that month he suffered a back spasm during a match and had to be substituted. In December 2019 he called on a team effort to score more goals, while his performances were praised by Bowyer. He suffered an injury later that month, with Bowyer not willing to rush him back. He returned to the first team later that month.

At the start of the 2020–21 season, Pritchard said he was working hard to make his way into the first team after his appearances had been restricted. In March 2021 it was announced that Pritchard would undergo back surgery and would be out of action for a number of months. On 12 May 2021 he was one of nine players that Bradford City announced would leave the club on 30 June 2021 when their contracts expire.

In August 2021 he signed for Eastleigh. He was released after one season with the club. On 27 June 2022, Pritchard joined Barnet.

Playing style
Following his first season with Bradford City, in June 2020 he was described as "the jack of all trades in midfield and even up front" who "looked equally at home down the middle or given a run out wide and his form up to Christmas was key in City's continued presence in the promotion places at the time".

Career statistics

References

1992 births
Living people
English footballers
Flackwell Heath F.C. players
Burnham F.C. players
Maidenhead United F.C. players
Blackpool F.C. players
Bradford City A.F.C. players
Eastleigh F.C. players
Barnet F.C. players
English Football League players
National League (English football) players
Southern Football League players
Association football wingers